Daisy Coulam is a British television producer and screenwriter known for creating Grantchester for ITV in 2014. She also created the Deadwater Fell mini-series for Channel 4 in 2020. Coulam is from Ryde on the Isle of Wight, and attended Ryde High school. She has written for BBC One soap operas, EastEnders, and Casualty.

References

External links

English television writers
British women television writers
English soap opera writers
English female screenwriters
People from Ryde
Living people
Year of birth missing (living people)
Place of birth missing (living people)